The Sydney 38 is a racing/cruising sailing yacht. It is one of the largest fleets of one-design oceangoing yachts in Australia. The yacht is manufactured by Sydney Yachts.

Specifications

Rig and sail dimensions

 I: 
 J: 
 P: 
 E: 
 STL:

Classification
 
CE Category: 	A - Ocean 	 
  	  	 
IRC Rating (approx): 	1.112

External links

Sydney 38 class association
Sydney Yachts

Sailing yachts
1990s sailboat type designs